Morgan Kneisky (born 31 August 1987) is a French former track and road racing cyclist, who rode professionally between 2010 and 2020 for the , ,  and  squads. Kneisky is a four-time UCI Track Cycling World Championships gold medallist, winning golds in the madison in 2013 with Vivien Brisse, 2015 with Bryan Coquard and 2017 with Benjamin Thomas, and the scratch in 2009. He retired following the 2021 UCI Track Cycling World Championships.

Biography
Morgan Kneisky began cycling as a youngster, when he joined the Amicale Cycliste Bisontine. In 2008, he joined the Chambéry Cyclisme Formation, a team in the top national division. That year, he won the Tour de Moselle. In 2009, Kneisky participated in his first Track Cycling World Championships, and came away with the Scratch race title. He has subsequently won three more world titles in the Madison at the 2013, 2015 and 2017 World Championships.

Kneisky signed with the British-based  for the 2014 season. After his contract with the team was not renewed for 2017, in December 2016 it was announced that Kneisky would join the  team for 2017. Following the disbanding of Armée de Terre at the end of 2017, Kneisky rejoined .

Major results

Track

2008
 3rd Points race, National Under-23 Championships
2009
 1st  Scratch, UCI World Championships
 National Championships
1st  Scratch
1st  Madison (with Kévin Fouache)
3rd Team pursuit
2010
 1st  Scratch, 2010–11 UCI Track Cycling World Cup Classics, Cali
 1st  Points race, National Championships
 2nd  Madison, UCI World Championships (with Christophe Riblon)
2011
 1st Six Days of Grenoble (with Iljo Keisse)
 2nd  Madison, 2011–12 UCI Track Cycling World Cup, Cali (with Vivien Brisse)
 UCI World Championships
3rd  Points race
3rd  Scratch
 3rd  Madison, UEC European Championships (with Vivien Brisse)
 3rd Six Days of Ghent (with Marc Hester)
2012
 2nd Six Days of Grenoble (with Bryan Coquard)
2013
 1st  Madison, UCI World Championships (with Vivien Brisse)
 1st  Madison, National Championships (with Julien Duval)
 1st Six Days of Grenoble (with Vivien Brisse)
2014
 1st Six Days of Grenoble (with Thomas Boudat)
 3rd  Madison, UEC European Championships (with Vivien Brisse)
 National Championships
3rd Madison (with Philémon Marcel-Millet)
3rd Scratch
2015
 1st  Madison, UCI World Championships (with Bryan Coquard)
 1st  Madison, 2015–16 UCI Track Cycling World Cup, Cambridge (with Benjamin Thomas)
 2nd Six Days of Bremen (with Jesper Mørkøv)
 3rd  Madison, UEC European Championships (with Bryan Coquard)
2016
 2nd  Madison, UCI World Championships (with Benjamin Thomas)
 2016–17 UCI Track Cycling World Cup, Apeldoorn
2nd  Points race
3rd  Team pursuit
 2nd  Madison, UEC European Championships (with Benjamin Thomas)
 2nd Six Days of Bremen (with Jesper Mørkøv)
 2nd Six Days of Fiorenzuola (with Benjamin Thomas)
 2nd Six Days of Rotterdam (with Christian Grasmann)
2017
 1st  Madison, UCI World Championships (with Benjamin Thomas)
 1st Six Days of Fiorenzuola (with Benjamin Thomas)
 2nd  Madison, 2017–18 UCI Track Cycling World Cup, Manchester (with Benjamin Thomas)
 2nd Six Days of Ghent (with Benjamin Thomas)
2018
 3rd Madison, National Championships (with Joseph Berlin-Sémon)
 3rd Six Days of Rotterdam (with Benjamin Thomas)
 3rd Six Days of Turin (with Joseph Berlin-Sémon)
2019
 National Championships
2nd Scratch
3rd Omnium
 3rd  Madison, 2019–20 UCI Track Cycling World Cup, Brisbane (with Kévin Vauquelin)
2020
 2nd Six Days of Bremen (with Theo Reinhardt)
 3rd Six Days of Berlin (with Theo Reinhardt)

Road

2008
 1st Overall Tour de Moselle
1st Stage 1
2010
 7th Grand Prix de la ville de Nogent-sur-Oise
2011
 3rd Grand Prix de la ville de Pérenchies
 10th Polynormande
2012
 1st Stage 3 Boucles de la Mayenne
 2nd Grand Prix de la ville de Pérenchies
 7th Gooikse Pijl
 9th Route Adélie
 10th Paris–Troyes
2013
 8th Overall Ronde de l'Oise
2014
 1st Stafford GP
 5th Ryedale Grand Prix
 8th Eddie Soens Memorial
 9th Wales Open Criterium
 10th Circuit of the Fens
2015
 1st  Points classification Tour Series
 2nd Stafford Kermesse
 3rd Chorley Grand Prix
 3rd Stafford GP
 4th Otley Grand Prix
 5th Eddie Soens Memorial
 6th Velothon Wales
2017
 6th Overall Rás Tailteann

References

External links

1987 births
Living people
French male cyclists
Sportspeople from Besançon
UCI Track Cycling World Champions (men)
French track cyclists
Cyclists from Bourgogne-Franche-Comté